This is a list of characters in the Disney animated series TaleSpin. TaleSpin was previewed on The Disney Channel in May through July 1990, and premiered in syndication in September of that year.

Higher for Hire
Baloo von Bruinwald XIII (voiced by Ed Gilbert) is the main character of the series, based primarily on the sloth bear from Disney's The Jungle Book, but with a flight cap and a yellow shirt (and four-fingered hands unlike in The Jungle Book where he had claws). Although lazy, slobbish, unreliable and always broke, he is also an excellent pilot and capable of the most daring maneuvers in the air. He flies a cargo plane called the Sea Duck. He will also selflessly come to the aid of those in need of help. His irresponsible behavior sometimes jeopardizes important situations, as seen in the episode "Your Baloo's in the Mail" when he fails to mail a winning ticket in the proper way, which puts Rebecca's ability to receive $100,000 in prize money at risk. He also has a penchant for getting into schemes that require him to dress up in drag to suit the situation, such as when he became Rebecca's "female" co-pilot Tan-Margaret (a play on Ann-Margret) in the episode "Feminine Air". Some of his mannerisms survive from The Jungle Book, including his nickname of "Papa Bear" by Kit, which Mowgli had given to him. He also calls Kit "Li'l Britches", as he did with Mowgli. In the first part of the episode "A Bad Reflection on You", Baloo gives his full name as "Baloo Bear" when introducing himself to a guard at Khan Tower. However, in the episode "The Balooest of the Bluebloods", it is revealed that Baloo comes from a prominent noble family and that Baloo's full designation is in fact "Baloo, Baron von Bruinwald XIII". However, he himself had been initially unaware, which raises the possibility that he was adopted. In this episode, he inherited $500 million in the form of an extravagant estate, which was taken from him to settle the matter of his family's impressively long history of owing back taxes, thus restoring the status quo. Baloo only once mentioned any family, in reference to a gramophone record that had belonged to his father. The name "Baloo" comes from the Hindi word for bear: bhālū (pronounced ). Gilbert replaced Phil Harris, who had originally been hired to reprise his role from The Jungle Book. At 85 years old, Harris had lost some of his comic timing, and producers concluded he would not be able to handle the load of a 65-episode series at his age and condition, nor were they in the position to chauffeur him to and from his home in Palm Springs, California, a two-hour trip in each direction, for each session. To perfect his rendition of Baloo’s Voice, Gilbert listened to old recordings of Phil Harris and practiced for many hours until he had it just right.
Kit Cloudkicker (voiced by R. J. Williams as a child in some episodes, Alan Roberts in others, and by Adam Pally as an adult in the 2017 DuckTales series) is a 12-year-old brown bear cub and the navigator aboard Baloo's plane, the Sea Duck. His first appearance was in the pilot episode and introductory television movie Plunder & Lightning. He was originally voiced by Alan Roberts who did his voice for 11 episodes that aired as a preview-run before the series' syndicated premiere. R. J. Williams voiced Kit for the rest of the series (including in the pilot episode Plunder & Lightning). His trademarks are a green sweater, a blue and red baseball cap worn backward and his ability to "cloud surf" (also referred to in the show as "cloud skiing"). The baseball cap was a gift to Kit from Baloo, as a sign of friendship and trust. In the episode "Flight School Confidential", Kit's height is revealed to be 3 feet 9 inches. Having lived with the air pirates under Don Karnage for one year prior to the start of the series, the introductory movie states that he left the air pirates because he "got sick" of them, implying that either he was mistreated or he got tired of Karnage's arrogance and ruthlessness. Kit first encountered Baloo when he crashed into him in Louie's Place, and later rejoined Baloo by grabbing onto the Sea Duck in order to escape from the air pirates because they were trying to catch him. His ambition was to become a pilot and to purchase his own aircraft. Occasionally showing a selfish streak, Kit sometimes put his dreams ahead of those of his friends. Having lived on his own for most of his life, Kit's distrust of adults was apparent in the show. He warmed to Baloo only after being given the chance to fly the Sea Duck, and even then was ready to leave for greener pastures. Nevertheless, he looked upon the other members of the "Higher for Hire" company as a surrogate family, affectionately referring to Baloo as "Papa Bear" on occasion. He clearly demonstrated his fondness for Rebecca Cunningham's daughter Molly on a number of occasions throughout the show, having been seen giving Molly piggyback rides, and on one occasion rescuing her on his airfoil (the device Kit uses for cloud surfing – see below). Baloo gives him the same nicknames, such as "Little Britches" that was bestowed on Mowgli from The Jungle Book. In the episode "Stormy Weather", Kit chastised Baloo saying, "You can't tell me what to do! You're not my dad!" This was a decision Kit would come to regret later in that episode. Kit had the ability to cloud surf using a crescent shaped metal device called an airfoil and a regular cord attached to the back of the Sea Duck or another plane, thus allowing him to "surf" in a similar fashion to someone wakeboarding or water skiing. It was not made clear where Kit learned this skill, but he demonstrates at numerous times throughout the various episodes that he is incredibly adept at it. He can also use his board to free glide without being towed by a plane. Baloo would often give his permission for Kit to be towed behind the Sea Duck when appropriate, trusting in Kit's skill to let him have some fun. Baloo also had enough confidence in Kit to keep himself safe on the airfoil when separated and under attack, or when Kit had to be outside for something important. Outside such situations however, he did not like Kit to take unnecessary risks, such as doing dangerous tricks or stunts. It is not exactly known when, where or how Kit was orphaned, but in the associated comics, it was revealed he spent some of his life on the streets and later a village of hobos (not unlike the Hoovervilles of actuality) prior to the series. He also claims that he never knew his parents, which could mean he had lost them when he was too young to remember, such as during infancy. Also his orphaning could be based on the fact that orphans were common during the nineteen-thirties, as the Great Depression was responsible for many children being orphaned, even though no reference to the Great Depression was made in the show.
Rebecca Cunningham (voiced by Sally Struthers) is a petite brown bear with long brown hair in a 1940s style, usually wears a white turtleneck sweater, and a purple-red jacket and matching slacks. She is nicknamed "Becky", "Beckers", "Beck" (used only once in episode "A Star is Torn"), and/or "BC" (used once in "War of the Weirds") by Baloo which at first she highly resented being called, but soon grew accustomed to with affection (in return, she calls him "Fly Boy" on occasion). She is an unassumingly attractive, yet shrewd businesswoman with an MBA. Rebecca bought out Baloo's Air Service and his plane in the introductory episode Plunder & Lightning when the pilot failed to pay his bank loan, and renamed the business "Higher for Hire". Although she originally relegated herself to the administrative and sales functions of the business, the series shows she eventually learns to be a capable would-be pilot in her own right. Baloo's laziness and carefree attitude towards his responsibilities often infuriates her explosive temper, despite having some possible feelings toward him at times which does come up as a blistering jealous streak, such as in the episode "A Star is Torn". Rebecca can sometimes be too quick to jump to conclusions and judge people. Rebecca lives with her daughter Molly in an apartment in an upscale part of Cape Suzette, one which incorporates a waterfall in its design. She occasionally concocts outrageous schemes to quickly make extra money, such as when she buys a pig to sniff out truffles instead of a new pontoon which the Sea Duck needs in the episode "The Bigger They Are, the Louder They Oink". She sometimes acts as a maternal figure for Kit Cloudkicker. However, in the episode "It Came from Beneath the Sea Duck", Rebecca's confidence in Kit was put to the test. While Kit was babysitting her daughter Molly, the girl accidentally got separated from him when the wagon she was on rolled down a hill and Kit had to chase it all the way to the docks. When Rebecca heard that her young daughter had been so far from home, she blamed Kit and would not let him explain what happened, accusing him of being "reckless and irresponsible". Later in the episode, her confidence in him was restored when he saved her daughter from a giant squid (voiced by Peter Cullen), and she apologized to him for being too quick to judge him.
Molly Elizabeth Cunningham (voiced by Janna Michaels and Eliza Coupe as an adult in the 2017 DuckTales series) is Rebecca's yellow-furred, 6-year-old daughter. She is an adventurous child who even at her age, is not afraid to speak her mind just like her mother, who nicknames her "Honey" and "Pumpkin" (while Baloo calls her "Button Nose"). Molly has a thing for her favorite ice cream brand "Frosty Pep", and sometimes pretends she is "Danger Woman" (the action/adventure heroine of a popular kids radio program modeled somewhere along the lines of a proto-Wonder Woman) while seeking adventure along with Kit and Baloo. She carries a doll named "Lucy". She often outwits adversaries much older than her. Her middle name, Elizabeth, is revealed in the episode "Mommy for a Day", and Molly is the only character to have any middle name revealed. Molly has taken a special interest in snow, which is problematic since it never snows in Cape Suzette. No mention was ever made of Molly's father, as series creator Jymn Magon reportedly said that Rebecca is either a widow or divorced, although at a 1998 U.S. fan convention Q&A online chat he did state in roundabout tones that she is actually divorced as originally written in the first TaleSpin press release. However this would clash with the comic The Long Flight Home which, although more centered toward Kit's past, states that her father died.
Wildcat (voiced by Pat Fraley) is a clueless and gangly lion who typically wears a mechanic's outfit. Although very childlike, he is ultimately a mechanical genius. For example, he can fix a smashed telephone in under ten seconds. He speaks with a slight lisp. Wildcat has a special place in his heart for dinosaurs as they are his favorite animal. He is also fond of pets and toys. He is honest and truthful, but at times too truthful, much to the annoyance of Baloo.

Air Pirates
Don Karnage (voiced by Jim Cummings, and by Jaime Camil in DuckTales) is the leader of a crew of air pirates and captain of the massive hybrid airship, the Iron Vulture, which serves as an airborne aircraft carrier. He is the main antagonist in the series. According to series creator Jymn Magon, he is a wolf, but has orangish-brown fur reminiscent of a fox; fans have speculated that he might be a red wolf. He wears a blue Napoleonic-style high-collared captain's tailcoat (with a red interior, red cuffs, and gold trim and buttons, and with the upper-front part unbuttoned and folded down as a small red triangular fold on his chest), a red belt, light bluish-gray pants, and dark-gray boots with gray cuffs. He is armed with a cutlass, which he wears on the left side of his waist, so that he can easily access it with his right hand. He speaks with an accent that is a blend of Spanish, Italian, and French accents. He pronounces /t/ and /d/ as dental consonants rather than the normal English alveolar consonants. He is a skilled pilot and ruthlessly cunning with an oversized ego that makes him blunder with whatever scheme or raid he conducts with his pirates. When dogfighting or raiding, he flies a hybrid fighter plane that appears to be based on a low-wing monoplane but with wings added so that it is actually a triplane. Voice actor Jim Cummings has cited Desi Arnaz's performance as Ricky Ricardo from the TV sitcom I Love Lucy as an inspiration.

Other Pirates
Mad Dog (voiced by Charlie Adler) is a scrawny coyote with a "Fu Manchu" style mustache who wears aviator goggles on his head. He is Don Karnage's first mate (second-in-command) and the smarter of the two sidekick henchmen, which isn't saying much. He has a whiny, nasal voice and is usually paired with Dumptruck.
Dumptruck (voiced by Chuck McCann) is a large stocky canine who is the second mate (third-in-command) of Don Karnage, though he made himself captain of the Iron Vulture in Karnage's absence in the episode "Stuck on You", and (true to his name) is rather unintelligent. He is a hulking Mastiff who speaks with a thick Swedish-Dutch accent and wears a top hat with a purple feather on the left side. He is frequently seen in the company of Mad Dog.
Gibber (voiced by McCann) is a stubby American Pitbull Terrier pirate who whispers advice and other information into Karnage's ear. He has never spoken a word louder than his mumbles.
Hacksaw (voiced by Adler) is a big yellowish colored husky pirate who has sticks of dynamite strapped around his arms and has his ears tucked together in a ring. He speaks with a whining Australian accent.
Ratchet (voiced by Rob Paulsen) is the mechanic of the group, who helped put together the lightning gun in the pilot episode Plunder & Lightning.
Hal (voiced by Frank Welker) is a large, overweight tan cat. Seen in only a few episodes, his only major role in the series (and probably the only one where he spoke) was when he accompanied Mad Dog and Dumptruck on their mission to take over the cliff guns in the episode "Jumping the Guns". His name stemmed from a throwaway line spoken by Don Karnage in Plunder & Lightning: "Open the bomb bay doors please, Hal", which is a reference to the famous line spoken by Dave in 2001: A Space Odyssey: "Open the pod bay doors please, HAL".
Sadie (voiced by McCann) is a short, fat brown Schnauzer pirate who has a gray mustache and wears a Viking helmet.
Jock (voiced by Tony Jay) is a black Scottish terrier and head engineer of the Iron Vulture who appears in the second part of the episode "A Bad Reflection on You". The TaleSpin DVD release of Volume 1 verified his name in the hearing-impaired English subtitles as being "Jock". Due to his thick Scottish burr, his name sounded like it was "Jacques" instead. Don Karnage mistakenly calls him "Scotty", a tongue-in-cheek reference by the writers to the famous Star Trek character portrayed by James Doohan. Moreover, "Jock" rhymes with "Spock", another classic Star Trek character, who was portrayed by Leonard Nimoy. Jock originally is from the Walt Disney film Lady and the Tramp.
Will is a one-time gag pirate seen very briefly in the episode "In Search of Ancient Blunders": Don Karnage ordered his crew to "Fire at will!". Ever obedient, they began shooting at Will as he ran past Karnage, instead of shooting at the Sea Duck which was what Karnage meant.

Thembrians
Colonel Ivanod Spigot (voiced by Michael Gough) is a bluish-colored warthog (as are all Thembrians), who is unnaturally short with a Napoleon complex and a prominent lisp, and who is the head of Thembria's "Glorious People's" Air Force. He never took a single flying lesson in his life, until he accidentally gave the High Marshall the idea to shoot every commanding officer in the Thembrian Air Force who failed an upcoming flight exam in the episode "Flying Dupes". He considers himself to be highly famous, and always introduces himself thus: "Perhaps you've heard of me?" He can easily be outsmarted by Baloo and Kit, as seen in the episode "The Idol Rich" when they reclaim an idol that Spigot had stolen from them. His grandmother was, apparently, devoured by polar bears, though whether as punishment for losing a national artifact (as that is the crime that warrants that punishment) or accident is unknown.
Sergeant Dunder (voiced by Lorenzo Music) is Spigot's second-in-command. He is gregarious and somewhat dense like Wildcat, but is nowhere near as self-centered and ruthless as Spigot. In fact, he is close friends with Baloo and Kit. He selflessly takes the blame for many of Colonel Spigot's numerous failures, and appears to be a devoted soldier.
The High Marshal (voiced by Jack Angel) is the highest-ranking military official in Thembria, and appears to serve as the country's strongman. He is dour, humorless and dislikes Spigot for his incompetence. He is married to an equally humorless unnamed female Thembrian who is strong enough to knock him out with a single punch. There are few problems the High Marshal does not solve without the threat of violence and death.
Professor Boris Crackpotkin (voiced by John Stephenson) is a mad scientist imprisoned at Bedevilled Island Maximum Security Prison for terrorist acts in the episode "Gruel and Unusual Punishment". He hates gruel, and has been shown to be willing to commit suicide in order to destroy Thembria's gruel reserves with no regard for the resultant collateral damage. His name is a reference to Peter Kropotkin, a famous communist leader.
Warden Slammer (voiced by Allan Melvin) is the stern warden of Bedevilled Island Maximum Security Prison in the episode "Gruel and Unusual Punishment". Although at first he seems ruthless, he is eventually revealed to be a more-or-less fair and levelheaded individual.
Bobbo (voiced by Edan Gross) is a 12-year-old boy who, along with Kit, enrolls in what seems to be a Thembrian flight school for 12-year-olds in the episode "Flight School Confidential". He meets and befriends Kit at the recruitment center, and the two boys become bunkmates at the supposed flight school. His height is 3 feet 2 inches.
Wally (voiced by Angel) is a manager of a Thembrian bomb factory who plots to send a bomb addressed to the High Marshal in the episode "Flying Dupes". He tricks Baloo into delivering the package containing the bomb, but he never really wants the bomb to reach the High Marshal. Instead, he wants the Thembrian border guards to find it before it can reach the High Marshal, so as to put the blame on Baloo and trigger a war with Cape Suzette which would increase bomb sales for his factory. Things do not go as planned, however, and the bomb does make it to the High Marshal, but in the end it is Wally who gets blown up (and survives). His fate after this is unknown.
Mick (voiced by Jim MacGeorge) is an associate of Wally who plots with him to send a bomb addressed to the High Marshal in the episode "Flying Dupes". He and Wally are both managers for the same bomb factory.

Khan Industries
Shere Khan (voiced by Tony Jay) is a Bengal tiger who also appeared in The Jungle Book, but here stands upright and wears a double-breasted blazer and trousers done on charcoal as well as an ivory shirt and a burgundy cravat. He sports retractable claws, which is a rarity in the show. He is sometimes accompanied by an unnamed emaciated tiger "yes-man" office aide. Khan is an extremely wealthy businessman and the head of the corporation Khan Industries (sometimes called Khan Enterprises) which is the dominant economic force in the city of Cape Suzette. Dour, humorless and slightly arrogant because of his wealth and position, he takes enjoyment out of running small companies out of business (Higher for Hire is sometimes on his hit list) with a sense of ruthlessness to skirt around the law as he chooses. He also likes to feed tiny insects to the many carnivorous plants he grows in his office. He once even made a deal with Don Karnage and his air pirates to create an artificial oil shortage so he could extort higher prices from the public in the episode "On a Wing and a Bear". He has a well-armed air force and navy, complete with battleships (referred to as "gunships"). This is mainly to protect his shipping and business interests worldwide. However, despite his ruthless and self-interested behavior, Khan is willing to act nobly at times, such as ordering his forces into the air to protect Cape Suzette from air pirate attacks. He is also shown to respect Baloo's piloting skills, most notably in the episode "From Here to Machinery", in which Khan's plane had been ambushed by Don Karnage's air pirates and the robotic pilot (created by the sleazy Professor Martin Torque) refused to deviate from its flight plan due to its programming, causing an arriving Baloo to forcibly remove the robot and take control of the plane (with Khan's permission) in order to engage in his usual dogfight with the pirates, resulting in the reinstatement of his laid off pilots. He also refers to Baloo as "a pilot to be reckoned with" in Plunder & Lightning after Baloo manages to destroy Don Karnage's lightning gun and severely damage the Iron Vulture. The name "Shere Khan" is derived from Hindi: Shere or Sher, i.e., a lion/tiger (pronounced ), and Khan, i.e., a South Asian title or surname.

Other
Buzz (voiced by Kenneth Mars) is a short purple-haired bird of indeterminate species who is Khan's eccentric in-house inventor as well as an old friend of Baloo's. A self-described "loyal company man," he is also the captain of the company chess team. Buzz's most noted invention is a prototype helicopter which promises to allow his employer to be the first marketer of a revolutionary new kind of aircraft. He appeared in the episodes "Baloo Thunder" and "Bullethead Baloo".
Mrs. Laslie Snarly (voiced by Jennifer Darling) is Khan's ruthless and loyal elderly secretary who appeared in the episodes "On a Wing and a Bear", "Baloo Thunder", and "Bullethead Baloo". She is (apparently) a shrew.
Doctor Debolt (voiced by Paulsen) is Khan's head scientist, and a slightly nervous rabbit, who led the effort that created the sub-electron amplifier to power Khan's industrial sectors, which was later stolen by Don Karnage and eventually used to power the lightning gun in the pilot episode Plunder & Lightning. In the episode, the name "Debolt" is never mentioned and he is simply referred to as "Doctor". However, his name is revealed to be Doctor Debolt in the comic book adaptation of the episode.
Douglas "Dougie" Benson (voiced by Mark L. Taylor) is a tabby cat and an investor working for Khan Industries who lost his job as a result of a combination of ridiculously bad investments (like glow-in-the-dark sunglasses), forging Khan's signature and flagrant misuse of Khan's private air force for personal gain in the episode "Louie's Last Stand". His quick temper and somewhat clumsy antics were a constant source of laughs for those around him (especially Khan's elite pilots). This laughter was something he absolutely could not stand, and he responded to it by repeatedly shouting "Stop laughing!" at the top of his lungs.
Walters (voiced by Phil Crowley) is a gray panther investor who was Douglas Benson's aide and confidant in the episode "Louie's Last Stand".
Mr. Simon Perry (voiced by Michael Bell) is a scheming and sharply dressed cheetah employee who was secretly cooperating with Khan's rival Mr. Sultan (the head of the Miniversal Corporation) to steal a top-secret helicopter from Khan Industries in the episode "Baloo Thunder".
Garth (voiced by Patric Zimmerman) and his unnamed partner (voiced by Tony Pope) are Khan's well-dressed panther and tiger goons respectively, who he sent to teach Baloo a lesson about greed after the bear foolishly took advantage of Khan's generosity in the episode "Save the Tiger". Garth's knees were in dire peril when he shouted angrily at Baloo during a phone call with his boss unintentionally, but he apparently avoided being the target of his employer's wrath.
Captain Hotspur (voiced by Welker) is the gravelly-voiced lion commander of one of Khan's gunships in the episode "A Bad Reflection on You", in which he was sent on a mission to solve the mysterious disappearances of Khan's cargo planes in the ultra-secret "Master Run" route near the towering Twin Spires, which turned out to be caused by Don Karnage's air pirates. Hotspur, much like Khan, is highly impressed with Baloo's abilities after seeing him in action flying the Sea Duck while setting off a mine in order to warn the ship in the nick of time that it was being dangerously lured into a minefield, and performing daring aerial manoeuvres while dodging the pirates.

Other
Louie (voiced by Cummings) is a fun-loving orangutan who also appeared in The Jungle Book, but here he wears a Hawaiian shirt, a straw hat and lei, and owns an island nightclub and motel called "Louie's Place", located near but outside the protection of Cape Suzette. It also serves as a refueling station/pit stop area for pilots. He has numerous monkey employees that help him run his establishment. He is Baloo's best friend (not the case in The Jungle Book but like in the later Jungle Cubs) but sometimes can be competitive with him when it comes to women, treasure-hunting and, on occasion, in business matters. As revealed in the episode "Louie's Last Stand", his hold on the island is somewhat tenuous, though through his own ingenuity and the aid of his friends he has managed to avoid losing it.
Louise L'Amour (voiced by Cummings) is Louie's wealthy ace aviator aunt who loves to party, and who appears in the episode "The Ransom of Red Chimp". Much to her nephew's chagrin she wreaks havoc everywhere she goes (particularly in his place of business), calls him "Louis", and aggressively chases handsome men who speak with accents (like Don Karnage and dashing French pilot Jacques Toujour) and ruins their lives. She suffers a broken heart quite easily yet always bounces back with a new flame at the ready. Her name is a play on the Western novelist/adventurer Louis L'Amour, and the title and plot of the episode in which she appears are loosely based on O. Henry's short story The Ransom of Red Chief.
The Jungle Aces Secret Midnight Club (often simply referred to as The Jungle Aces) is a club of young wannabe pilots, of whom Kit is a member. Other club members include club leader Ernie (a hyena; voiced by Whitby Hertford), a hippo, a rabbit, and a bird. The club rules state that all members must have had an adventure before joining, a fact that temporarily prevented Oscar Vandersnoot from joining until he had an adventure in the episode "Captains Outrageous". They briefly changed their name to "The Bullethead Brigade" in the episode "Bullethead Baloo".
Oscar Vandersnoot (voiced by Ben Ryan Ganger) is a short, geeky-looking yellow bear cub who wears a formal jacket, shirt, bowtie, and thick glasses in the episode "Captains Outrageous". He is an upper-crust naïve friend of Kit's who wants to join his Jungle Aces Secret Midnight Club, much to the consternation of the other members since one rule stipulates that a person must have experienced a real adventure in order to join the club. An attempt by Kit to help him join is thwarted by Don Karnage, who wants to kidnap Oscar in order to force his rich parents, in particular his very overprotective mother, to pay a hefty ransom for him. Kit, Baloo and Wildcat hatch up a plan in which Baloo takes Oscar on a ride in the Sea Duck while, unbeknownst to Oscar, Kit and Wildcat dress up as pirates and fly out in a biplane in order to pretend to attack the Sea Duck so as to give Oscar an "adventure", and thus get him into the club. (Rebecca and Mrs. Vandersnoot require a little convincing before Oscar is allowed to ride in the Sea Duck.) Before the plan can succeed, however, Kit and Wildcat are captured by the real pirates, who then launch a real attack on the Sea Duck, resulting in Oscar and Baloo actually being held hostage, along with Kit and Wildcat, by the air pirate leader. In the end, Oscar manages to outsmart Karnage, saves himself and his friends, becomes a local hero, and becomes a member and honorary president of The Jungle Aces Secret Midnight Club.
Trader Moe (voiced by Cummings) is a diminutive international criminal alligator with a short temper who is always accompanied by a pair of hulking and very dimwitted heavies, a rhinoceros and a gorilla (voiced by McCann and Cummings respectively), who are only known collectively as "The Goons". He appeared in the episodes "Time Waits for No Bear", "The Golden Sprocket of Friendship", and "Double or Nothing". His name is a reference to the grocery store, Trader Joe's.
El Gato (voiced by Cummings) is a large, maniacal swarthy-looking feline with a thick Spanish accent and a nasty temper, who wears a colorful poncho, a Mexican-styled sombrero, and braided hair in the episode "Destiny Rides Again". Accompanied by a pet crow and flying on a giant condor (both voiced by Welker), he is persistent on obtaining the Idol of Doom (a golden llama-statuette talisman famed for having great mystical powers for those who control it) which he wants to use for evil and almost succeeds when he tries to wrangle it from Baloo and Kit's unwanted possession.
Professor Edward O'Bowens (voiced by Patrick Pinney) is a chimpanzee archaeologist who discovers the "Idol of the Spirit Switcher" in an ancient, booby-trapped temple in the episode "A Baloo Switcheroo". When Don Karnage and his pirates try to steal the idol, O'Bowens escapes with it and gives it to Baloo and Kit for safekeeping, telling them to fly off while he stays behind to distract the pirates. Later on, after the idol causes Baloo to switch bodies with Kit and Rebecca to switch bodies with Karnage, O'Bowens joins Baloo, Kit, and Rebecca, and goes with them to help resolve the situation. He makes a cameo appearance in the episode "Destiny Rides Again". His clothing and the whip that he carries are references to Indiana Jones, as is the fact that he takes an idol from a booby-trapped temple.
Ignatius (also known as Ignatz) (voiced by S. Scott Bullock), is an intelligent semi-anthropomorphic parrot who knows the location of a large treasure in the episode "Polly Wants a Treasure". He and Baloo do not get along, but he befriends Kit, and the two of them go looking for the treasure. However, Don Karnage wants to get Ignatz so that the parrot can tell him where the treasure is.
Seymour (voiced by Hamilton Camp) is the red wolf owner of the aquarium/theme park "Seymour's See More Seaquarium" in the episode "All's Whale That Ends Whale". He abuses and neglects the animals in his care, including a whale named Moby Dimple (voiced by Welker) who is befriended by Kit. Kit and Baloo become concerned about Dimple's wellbeing, much to Seymour's annoyance. Kit and Baloo eventually help Dimple escape from the theme park, and Seymour ends up getting arrested for possessing an illegal type of harpoon.
Inspector Ike Burrow (voiced by Cummings) is an otter and an inspector who works for ACHOO (the Agency Concerned with the Happiness of Oceanic Oddities) in the episode "All's Whale That Ends Whale". He inspects Seymour's theme park, but due to illusions created by Seymour and his employees, Burrow fails to notice anything wrong with the park. Later on, Burrow spots Seymour with an illegal harpoon, and leads the police to arrest Seymour.
Barney O'Turret (voiced by Angel) is a short and grizzled, but good-natured retiree pig cliff gun guard in Cape Suzette who wears overalls and a captain's cap, and who worked on the cliffs for 50 years and never fired a shot (but claims to, according to his catchphrase, "have seen it done a million times"). He is clueless and constantly underfoot as Baloo and Louie try to stop a plot by the air pirates to launch a raid on the city when they overpower the guards in order to let the Iron Vulture pass beyond the protective outer cliffs. Despite his bumbling, he along with the pilot and nightclub owner, manages to save the day. He appears in the episode "Jumping the Guns".
MacKnee (voiced by Cummings) is a large, child-hating koala with a nasty temper and a gruff Australian accent who appears in the episode "Mommy for a Day". This hunter/poacher will go to any lengths to bag the perfect beast (even endangering the lives of others in the name of profit), in particular when he captures, loses and re-hunts a mythical but gentle Inkara, who Molly befriends and names Henry (voiced by Welker) and whom she protects from MacKnee's clutches.
Covington (voiced by Cummings) is a smooth-talking, debonair, light-gray panther con artist who wears a moustache, sharp clothing and a toupee in the episode "Molly Coddled". During a high-speed boat chase around Cape Suzette's inner harbor, he stashed an ancient wooden cat talisman that lead to a rich treasure on Skull Island (which isn't exactly like the real Skull Island very much) in the Sea Duck to hide it from two criminal badger associates he recently double crossed. When Molly discovered it and took it for a doll the next morning, he charmed Rebecca's heart in order to get to the doll. Molly saw him for what he was and knowing that he was really not interested in her mother, did everything she could to drive him away and keep him from getting his hands on the doll. After a series of tangles and shin-kicks from the little girl, he recovered the wooden figurine and briefly possessed the ruby statuette it pointed the way to, only to be foiled by Molly who finally exposed him as a fraud to Rebecca. A little later on, after accidentally letting go of the ruby during a greedy struggle near a bubbling hot mud pit, he was finally caught by his ex-partners and received (off-screen) his just deserts from them.
Daring Dan Dawson (voiced by Cam Clarke) is the sleazy owner and lead performer of an aerial circus in the episode "Stormy Weather". He appears to be a ferret wearing an old fashioned aviator's cap and goggles. He nearly destroyed the father/son bond between Kit and Baloo through manipulation and outright lies, briefly convincing Kit to run away and join his circus.
Prince Neverhasbeenbroke (voiced by Cummings) is an eccentric but kindly hyena ruler of an unnamed Middle Eastern desert country who requests Higher for Hire to deliver a large iceberg to his country in order to create a ski slope near his palace in the episode "I Only Have Ice for You". The crew manage to pull off the delivery, despite being temporarily hijacked by Don Karnage's air pirates who think that diamonds are hidden in it, and a know-it-all Rebecca who flies the Sea Duck while delivering it due to Baloo's temporarily suspended license. He wears a turban and tunic, and speaks with a stereotypical Indian accent. He also has his own harem which is shown briefly with him during a cameo appearance in the episode "The Golden Sprocket of Friendship".
Howard Huge (voiced by Adler) is a rich but maniacal hippopotamus airplane designer appearing in the episode "Bearly Alive". When Baloo encountered him, he was kidnapping pilots and stripping their planes for parts and materials to build a gigantic flying wing, which he called the "Titanium Turkey". His name is an obvious pun on famed aviation pioneer Howard Hughes.
Jack Case (voiced by Brian Cummings) is a semi-villainous rabbit and wannabe spy who appeared in the episode "A Spy in the Ointment". He is actually a mailman who accidentally sent the wrong package to the Thembrian High Marshal. Planning to switch the wrong package for the right one, he convinced Rebecca that he was a government spy and that as a matter of national security he needed to be flown into Thembria. Shortly afterward, it was revealed that Case was a fraud: the package contained expensive fishing worms for the High Marshall. Case endangered Baloo and Rebecca by getting them caught up in his espionage fantasies and making Colonel Spigot think they were involved in a bomb plot against the High Marshall, and in return they left him behind when they fled Thembria. Case is last seen in the custody of Thembrian forces, and his fate after this is unknown.
Doctor Axolotl (voiced by Rodger Bumpass) is a psychotic lizard inventor who sought revenge against Shere Khan with his robot, the Mechanical Electric Laborer or M.E.L. (voiced by David Lodge), which he reprogrammed to be highly destructive and nearly unstoppable in the episode "Bullethead Baloo".
Doctor Zibaldo (voiced by Dan Castellaneta) is a short, manic fox mad scientist who invented a shrink ray for the purpose of fitting his clothes into luggage easier in the episode "The Incredible Shrinking Molly". After a mishap in which Molly Cunningham was accidentally shrunk, he abandoned his research in favor of a new idea: television. Needless to say, Baloo was not impressed with this idea. An interesting fact about Doctor Zibaldo is that the voice Castellaneta used to play him is the same voice he used to play Megavolt in Darkwing Duck.
Colonel Grogg (voiced by Bell) is a jingoistic, paranoid and overly excitable military intelligence officer spaniel who appeared in the episode "War of the Weirds". Obsessed with the "threat" of an alien invasion, he clandestinely monitored and recorded Baloo's radio transmissions during his phony flight to Mars, which, unbeknownst to Grogg was actually a lame attempt to scam a two-week vacation at Lake Flacid out of Rebecca. He subsequently became convinced that a Martian invasion was imminent after Baloo faked a Martian attack over the radio in order to keep Rebecca from continually calling him. Overzealous in stopping the Martians and threatening to put those responsible in jail if it proved to be a hoax, he dragged Rebecca — who was in on the "invasion" in order to teach her pilot a lesson about lying — and Wildcat along to the lake. After seeing the convincing light show put on by Baloo and Kit, he went into a frenzy and attacked Baloo's camp with machine gun fire and grenades. He was soon confronted by Baloo (in a Martian outfit) and saw him "attack" Rebecca with a "flesh-melting ooze gun" that squirts guacamole on her. Terrified, Grogg fled from the scene to bring reinforcements led by his bulldog uncle general Bucky (voiced by John Stephenson). Unfortunately for Grogg, upon his return to the lake, not only were there no signs of an invasion (Martian or otherwise), but the only people there (actually the Higher for Hire crew posing as a "family" out on a camping trip) claimed to have seen nothing either. Embarrassed and convinced that his nephew was hallucinating (again), the general quickly busted Grogg down in rank to private, much to his disillusionment.
Professor Martin Torque (voiced by Patrick Gorman) is a Doberman inventor who sought to replace every pilot in Cape Suzette with his Auto-Aviator (voiced by Fraley), a coldly efficient robotic pilot that was bought by Shere Khan in the episode "From Here to Machinery". The result was that every freelance cargo service in the city (including Higher for Hire) was put out of business, and every pilot (freelance or otherwise) was put out of work. After his attempt flopped in an incident with the air pirates (due to the robots' programing rendering them unable to deviate from their course), he attempted to sell his reprogrammed machines to uninterested Thembrian housewives at a miserable post in the middle of nowhere.
Babyface Half Nelson (voiced by Camp) is a bulldog gangster who tricked Baloo into helping him escape police custody in the episode "Bringing Down Babyface". When he is not in police custody, he lives with his mother Mrs. Half Nelson and is sometimes accompanied by two goons (voiced by Ed Gilbert). His name is a reference to Baby Face Nelson.
Mrs. Half Nelson (voiced by Billie Hayes) is Babyface Half Nelson's mother in the episode "Bringing Down Babyface".
Detective Thursday (voiced by Angel) is a hard-boiled canine detective who apparently runs a secret branch of the Cape Suzette police force, which is headquartered beneath a Laundromat in the episode "Vowel Play". He is highly reminiscent of Humphrey Bogart, and his name is a clear reference to Joe Friday. His main underling is Officer Gertalin.
Heimlich Menudo (voiced by Mars) is a leopard criminal featured in the episode "Vowel Play", and who is absolutely obsessed with diamonds, to the point that he practically worships them and even has diamonds for teeth. He and his weasel henchman Weazel (voiced by David L. Lander) tried to steal all the diamonds in Cape Suzette using a highly ambitious plan he called "the Heimlich Maneuver".
Officer Gertalin (voiced by Danny Mann) is a dog police officer and the main underling of Detective Thursday in the episode "Vowel Play". An unnamed police officer (voiced by Camp) who looks almost identical to Gertalin but has a different voice appears in the episode "Bringing Down Babyface", but it is unclear whether it is Gertalin or a separate officer. Likewise, an officer who resembles Gertalin makes a non-speaking appearance near the end of the episode "All's Whale That Ends Whale", in which he participates in the arrest of Seymour for possessing an illegal harpoon.
Officer Malarkey (voiced by Cummings) is a pig police officer who speaks with an Irish accent in the episode "Bringing Down Babyface". An unnamed pig police officer also makes a brief non-speaking appearance in the episode "Vowel Play", but it is unclear whether it is Malarkey or a separate officer. Likewise, an officer who resembles Malarkey makes a non-speaking appearance near the end of the episode "All's Whale That Ends Whale", in which he participates in the arrest of Seymour for possessing an illegal harpoon.
Tiny (voiced by Cummings) is an exceptionally large and tall polar bear and the owner and bartender of "Tiny's Grill", a restaurant and bar frequented by gangsters in the episode "Bringing Down Babyface". An alleyway behind Tiny's restaurant features a manhole that is the entrance to Babyface Half Nelson's sewer hideout.
Mr. Sultan (voiced by Corey Burton) is the head of the Miniversal Corporation, the rival of Shere Khan's corporation Khan Industries. He is an elderly tiger who paid Mr. Perry to steal Buzz's top secret helicopter prototype and apparently planned to pass it off as his own company's design. He appears in the episode "Baloo Thunder".
Kitten Kaboodle (voiced by Tress MacNeille) is a seductive blond feline Starrywood (read "Hollywood") starlet with a husky Lauren Bacall-like voice who acts like a femme fatale and can manipulate any hapless male under her spell in the episode "A Star is Torn". She became a wedge between Baloo and Rebecca's relationship when he saved Kaboodle's life in an accident during a street film shoot and hires him to be a stunt pilot for her next film that is being plagued by a series of accidents by a mysterious saboteur who Rebecca discovers to be Kaboodle herself. Kaboodle was sabotaging her own films in order to boost her sagging popularity and poor acting skills. She outed herself during the failed plane accident she set up for the smitten Baloo (who gave her the nickname "Kiki") and was subsequently taken in by the police. She also had a cameo appearance in the episode "Louie's Last Stand".
Katie Dodd (voiced by Ellen Gerstell) is a vixen archaeologist who discovered the lost city of Tinabula in the desert nation of Ghaphia in the episode "For Whom the Bell Klangs". This tall, feisty and voluptuous redhead has as much attitude as she does in looks and intelligence, since she is prone to stand-offish behavior and not afraid to tell any man to go jump in a lake. However, this did not stop Baloo and Louie from showing off for her in a futile attempt to compete for her attentions.
Myra (voiced by Liz Georges) is a petite brunette vixen dressed in khakis, a pith helmet and wears square-rimmed glasses, and is the State Archaeologist and Minister of Culture for the tiny desert country of Aridia in the episode "In Search of Ancient Blunders". A genuinely nice and very intelligent woman, her sunny disposition is nearly the exact polar opposite of Katie Dodd's. She enlists Baloo and Wildcat to help find a lost pyramid, in order to create a tourist attraction for her impoverished country. She is normally slow to anger, but not afraid to stand up and show some backbone when it really counts.
Princess Lotta L'Amour (voiced by Kath Soucie) is the vixen crown princess of the Middle-Eastern Kingdom of Macadamia who is smart, beautiful and strong in comparison to her seemingly dim-witted monarch rabbit father King Amuck in the episode "The Road to Macadamia". She not only becomes the target for Baloo and Louie's affections during a cargo pick-up to the country, but also of the power-hungry buzzard Chancellor Trample who wants to marry her in order to run the kingdom after staging a palace coup d'etat by withholding back the tax money of the national treasury to create a public uprising that she, Baloo and Louie foil in time. Although she does like both Baloo and Louie, she does not fall for either one of them but is grateful to them for restoring her kingdom back to the rightful rulers.
King Amuck (voiced by Howard Morris) is the aged and congenial rabbit monarch of the Kingdom of Macadamia and Princess Lotta L'Amour's father in the episode "The Road to Macadamia". Dressed as a cross between a king and a court jester, he appears at first as not too bright but is a shrewd leader who is manipulated by his scheming Royal Chancellor Trample to consider abdicating his throne by making him believe he is too incompetent to rule the people, and to almost allow Trample to marry Princess Lotta against her wishes in order to restore faith in the monarchy. After the plot fails, Amuck frugally rewards Baloo and Louie with the cargo order of ten sacks of chocolate-covered macadamia nuts and an invoice of $192.12 that they came for in the first place, instead of the rich reward they expected.
Chancellor Trample (voiced by Cummings) is a conniving vulture out to usurp the throne of King Amuck in order to gain the riches of the royal house of Macadamia in the episode "The Road to Macadamia". At first, he plans to do this by secretly raising taxes to make the king unpopular and the kingdom's citizens and coffers poor. At the time of Baloo and Louie's arrival, he hatches another scheme to marry Amuck's daughter Princess Lotta L'Amour as the three of them attempt to uncover the plot despite him having his own small army of Royal Guard rhinos at his command. When Trample's plans go awry, he confesses his crimes, begging to be locked up and tortured than endure more of Baloo and Louie's antics, which all parties agreed heartily.
Owl Capone (voiced by Maurice LaMarche) is a diminutive gangster who appears in the episode "My Fair Baloo". He overtakes the gigantic Spruce Moose (read "Spruce Goose"), which is a giant airplane where Baloo and Rebecca go out to a swanky businessman's ball, primarily since Rebecca wished to schmooze with the wealthy clientele. Capone steals jewelry from most of the people there (except Rebecca, who did not have any on her) and takes the people in the plane hostage twice. He is a parody the real-life gangster "Scarface" Al Capone.
Thaddeus E. Klang (voiced by Tim Curry) is the leader of a cult-like organization seeking the secret weapon hidden in the lost city of Tinabula in the episode "For Whom the Bell Klangs". He is a green cobra with a black cloak, warlock-like hat, metallic jaw (capable of crushing hard objects with his bites), and metallic limbs, who speaks with a metallic echo in his voice (the abundance of metal being the basis for his name). He managed to pose quite a threat and even obtained the lost city's weapon (a destructive bell-like device that utilized sonic waves), but was defeated when he fired the weapon at the "master bell", which triggered it and buried the city. Afterward, his metallic parts fell off, revealing him to simply be a regular, albeit oversized, cobra, who then began to wander in the desert. His fate after this is unknown.
Ace London (voiced by Phil Hartman) is a highly arrogant, yet highly regarded gray wolf test pilot who went to school with Baloo and makes fun of him and his capabilities after winning a game of billiards against him in the episode "Mach One for the Gipper". He then accidentally switches Baloo's cargo of pickles with a top-secret jet engine, but instead of telling the truth when asked, he lies and says that Baloo did it. When Don Karnage tries to steal the engine, the true test of the two pilots begins. Unfortunately for Ace, not only do Baloo and Wildcat break the soundbarrier instead of him, but his lies are revealed and he is forced to deliver Baloo's cargo. Extremely egotistical, he not only lies about Baloo switching the cargo, but he also claims that Baloo resisted his orders to hand over the cargo and forced him and the pilots sent to assist him to land, when in reality Baloo had no idea he had the wrong freight, and Ace himself fired on Baloo, who tried to return the engine and did not attack at all.
Whistlestop Jackson (voiced by Camp) is Baloo's childhood hero who appears in the episode "Whistlestop Jackson, Legend". Whistlestop was a "hero to millions" and a "legend in his own time" for his aviation mastery and trademark biplane. As a younger man, he once beat out start-up entrepreneur Shere Khan on an air cargo contract, leaving Khan a bitter rival. However, by the time Rebecca hires him to be Higher for Hire's vice president, Whistlestop's skills are sorely obsolete and he does business solely based on his reputation. Although Baloo's opinion of Whistlestop becomes deflated when the aging pilot bungles a trial flight of the Sea Duck and makes him take the blame, the two make up and, with Baloo's help, Whistlestop again beats Khan in securing another lucrative air cargo contract, this time for Higher for Hire, which allows the aviation master to retire in the great bang he had always hoped for.
Finance Minister LaFong (voiced by Angel) is the finance minister of the country of Clopstokia who conspires with Shere Khan to secure a lucrative air cargo contract between Clopstokia and Khan Enterprises in the episode "Whistlestop Jackson, Legend". He is also in favor of Khan's efforts to eliminate Whistlestop Jackson as a threat to their plan.
Joe Magee (voiced by Hal Smith) is an old ace pilot and flight instructor who appears in the episode "The Old Man and the Sea Duck". During a situation in which Baloo is flying alone in the Sea Duck, Magee helps Baloo to land at his airfield because Baloo cannot remember how to fly due to amnesia he had suffered from a blow to the head during a previous flight. He then helps Baloo regain his memories of flying by teaching him how to fly again and about the true meaning of flying (that is, having fun and feeling free). When Baloo regains his memories, Magee suggests that he fly home alone but Baloo is too scared to fly solo due to a phobia of flying alone that he has developed since his two recent flight emergencies in the Sea Duck. When Baloo fakes that he is sick in order to avoid flying, Magee pretends to fall off a ladder and break his leg. Fearing that his friend is hurt, Baloo does what Magee asks him to and flies to the nearest town to get Doctor Cooper, but when he returns he finds that Magee is gone and the airfield and flight school look abandoned. The doctor explains that Magee walked with a cane because he broke his leg while rescuing the crew of a burning airplane (the injury forced him to permanently quit flying), and afterwards he built the flight school. According to the doctor, people say that Magee "trained the best" and "was the best". The doctor then tells Baloo that Magee died twenty years earlier. After hearing this, Baloo realizes that he was helped by Magee's spirit, whom he refers to as a "guardian angel".
Doctor Cooper (voiced by Alan Young) is a tortoise doctor whom Joe Magee told Baloo to go and get in order to treat Magee's supposedly injured leg in the episode "The Old Man and the Sea Duck". Cooper is the one who later informs Baloo of the truth about Joe Magee's life. Cooper lives and works in a town twenty miles north of Magee's flight school.
Rick Sky (voiced by Simon Templeman) is an ace fighter pilot who speaks with a British accent and appears in the episode "Bygones". Captain Rick Sky was the leader of the legendary "Squadron of Seven" who fought in the Great War, which ended 20 years before the episode takes place. While transporting a shipment of silver bars to help finance the war effort, he and his squadron mysteriously vanished, and people thought that he and his squadron stole the silver. Baloo (who has been a fan of Rick Sky since childhood and reads comic books about him) ends up finding him adrift in the sea. At first Baloo doubts that the person he rescued is Rick Sky, because the idea seems unbelievable and he looks far too young (since he should be about 50 years old by this time, but he looks like he is only 30). However, after the mysterious figure demonstrates his flying skills by taking the controls of the Sea Duck and evading an air pirate attack, Baloo becomes inclined to believe that the man really is Rick Sky. Baloo's belief, however, is later extinguished when Sky steals the Sea Duck in order to search for the missing silver so he can finish his squadron's mission to deliver it and restore the honor of his squadron. Baloo chases after the stolen Sea Duck, which is captured along with Sky by Don Karnage's air pirates. Baloo rescues Sky and retrieves the Sea Duck, and threatens to throw the "thief" out of the plane, but the man proves he is indeed Rick Sky by showing Baloo his Distinguished Flying Cross medal. Afterwards, they fly to some ice cliffs in search of the silver, but end up finding the rest of Sky's squadron frozen in ice. It is then made clear to Sky that he and his squadron froze into the cliffs during a snowstorm, preserving them alive in suspended animation so that they did not age, and preserving their planes in perfect working order. Two decades later, Sky thawed out and drifted out to sea, where he was rescued by Baloo at the beginning of the episode. Baloo and Sky thaw out the other six members of the squadron just before the air pirates show up. Sky persuades Baloo to take the silver (which was stored in one of the squadron's biplanes) and finish the delivery mission, while Sky and his squadron engage the pirates in a dogfight. Despite the fact that their biplanes are 20 years obsolete, the squadron is able to defeat the pirate fighter planes, but they run into trouble when the pirates' mother-ship, the Iron Vulture, attacks them. However, after Baloo flies in with his Sea Duck and rescues Sky from being annihilated by cannon fire, the squadron together with Baloo are able to inflict severe damage to the Iron Vulture, forcing it to retreat. Afterwards, Rick Sky and the Squadron of Seven fly off into the sunset to an unknown fate, while Baloo flies back to Higher for Hire to refuel before completing the squadron's mission to deliver the silver and restore their honor. Of the other six members of the Squadron of Seven, only three are named: Scott, Johnny, and Reggie. Reggie (voiced by Neil Ross) is the only member other than Rick Sky who speaks, and he does so in a British accent like his leader.
Cool Hands Luke (voiced by Ron Feinberg) is a polar bear who is about the same size as Baloo, and has a highly aggressive, chauvinistic, narcissistic, and apparently sociopathic (he claims when caught cheating that he does not have a conscience) attitude. He appears in the episode "Feminine Air", in which he makes fun of the fact that Baloo works for a woman, and presses the issue to drive business away from Higher for Hire. His winning streak in the Air Scavenger Race (achieved through cheating) was broken when Rebecca and Baloo (in his "Tan-Margaret" persona) beat him and revealed him to be a fraud. His name is a pun on the book and film Cool Hand Luke.
Mr. Pomeroy (voiced by Alan Oppenheimer) is the principal at Kit's grade school in the episode "Sheepskin Deep". He is a short gruff brown bear who administers and grades Baloo's equivalency test to determine whether he will receive his diploma. At first, it seems that Baloo failed by one question, but later Baloo proves to Pomeroy that he answered the question correctly, and so Pomeroy gives Baloo a passing grade and his diploma.
Mrs. Morrissey (voiced by Susan Tolsky) is a teacher at Kit's grade school in the episode "Sheepskin Deep". Kit is a member of her class, and Baloo temporarily joins the class in order to get his diploma. When she first appears, she welcomes Baloo back to school and Baloo recognizes her and addresses her by name, indicating that she was one of Baloo's original grade school teachers when he was a child. She is an elderly brown bear with tan fur and a slightly hunched back.
Clementine Clevenger (voiced by Soucie) is a tall, smart and earthy blonde feline dressed up in Western clothing and speaks with an American Southern accent in the episode "Citizen Khan". She is the unwitting secretary/court reporter/Girl Friday of the corrupt and self-appointed Sheriff Gomer in the small, Western frontier-type mining town of Boomstone (read Tombstone, Arizona) owned by Khan Industries and where the Higher for Hire crew of Baloo, Kit and Wildcat are forced to land by the unscrupulous sheriff and his dim-witted deputy Wendell. Fed up with the corrupt Gomer for hijacking and kidnapping people to mine for the highly volatile and yet-to-be valuable substance urgonium and hiding it from Khan, she (and the other residents of the town/mine) mistakes Wildcat for the corporate magnate after an explosion soots his face with tiger-like markings that make him look like Khan (and he decides to impersonate Khan after Baloo convinces him to do so in order to allow them to leave), for whom she has a deep admiration. When the mistreated miners hold Wildcat hostage in order to leave the mine, she sneaks off to phone Khan's headquarters in Cape Suzette where she unknowingly speaks to the real Shere Khan about the situation, but she gets cut off by Gomer, who locks her up in her boarding room and Khan decides to investigate his own apparent kidnapping. After a daring escape and rescuing Baloo and Kit from Gomer's jail cell, she leads them to the mine where the sheriff and deputy blow-up the entrance and decide to make their getaway just as Khan arrives in his private plane to find out what is going on. In the aftermath of catching the crooked lawmen and meeting the CEO, she becomes the new foreman of the urgonium mine. She appreciates Wildcat's gentleness, innocent sincerity and mechanical genius, with him having mutual feelings for her as well (calling her "Clem"), and they both fall in love. She makes a cameo appearance in the episode "Sheepskin Deep".
Sheriff Gomer (voiced by David Doyle) is a hog wearing a small-town Western frontier sheriff outfit and speaks with an abrasive voice in the episode "Citizen Khan". He is actually a mine foreman in the mining town of Boomstone who works for Khan Enterprises, and withholds information from Khan about the explosive urgonium. With his less-than-smart cohort and deputy Wendell, he forces any passersby to work in the mines on trumped-up charges and even imprisons them. Baloo, Kit and Wildcat manage to stop Gomer and Wendell during a mid-air chase involving rotten kumquats that gum up their getaway plane. They are later (ironically) forced to work in the very same mine in which they held their former captives.
Wendell (voiced by Welker) is Sheriff Gomer's not-so-intelligent wolf deputy and accomplice who speaks with an American Southern accent in the episode "Citizen Khan".
Wan Lo (voiced by Robert Ito) is the evil panda emperor of the city of Panda-La (read "Shangri-La") featured in the episode "Last Horizons". When Baloo rediscovers the city and tells him and his people that they can visit Cape Suzette, Wan Lo jumps at the chance and orders his people to fly the city there using giant balloons in order to invade and conquer it. With heat-seeking rockets among their weapons, Panda-La easily defeats the city's defenses. Being blamed for causing the invasion, Baloo seeks to redeem himself by flying out alone to fight against Wan Lo's forces. Filling the Sea Duck with ice cream, Baloo at first evades the heat-seeking rockets, but is eventually captured. While in captivity, Baloo tries to negotiate with Wan Lo, but the emperor explains that his people do not seek to make friends but rather to conquer new territories in which to live. Baloo later receives some unexpected help from Kit, Louie, Rebecca, and Wildcat, which allows him to escape and get back to the Sea Duck. During the ensuing battle, Baloo manages to use the pandas' own weapons against them and defeats Panda-La. Wan Lo is last seen floating down into Cape Suzette's bay in the basket of a parachute-balloon with his two sons after escaping from his crashing palace-balloon. His fate after this is unknown, as is the fate of his people.
Muffy and Buffy Vanderschmere (voiced by Linda Gary and Welker respectively) are a fox con artist couple posing as rich, snobbish clients who trick Higher for Hire into transporting some supposedly valuable family jewels to Hyenasport, hoping to get the Sea Duck as collateral insurance in case of theft or loss of the jewelry as deemed by Rebecca in the episode "A Touch of Glass". Thus they make an effort to lose the jewels at every opportunity, including throwing them out one of the seaplane's windows and, after landing at Louie's Place, by putting the blame on Louie for the "stolen" jewels (since both they and Rebecca find the nightclub/motel and its owner too seedy for their tastes). They are later exposed by the nightclub owner as frauds wanted by the law and the jewels are proved to be fakes. They are overpowered by Louie and Rebecca just minutes after they had taken-off in the plane. Muffy is dressed in a blue dress and wide-brimmed hat, a pearl necklace, bangles on her ankles and has blonde hair (that turns out to be a wig), and Buffy is dressed like a golfer. Both speak by imitating Bostonian blueblood accents, although Buffy does sound a bit like Thurston Howell, III. They make cameo appearances in the episodes "Vowel Play", "The Golden Sprocket of Friendship", "Last Horizons", "My Fair Baloo", and "Mach One for the Gipper".
Broadcast Sally (voiced by Sheryl Bernstein) is a large, strong and sensual female hippopotamus with a very sultry voice who works as a popular morning disc jockey at K-CAPE radio station in Cape Suzette, mainly wearing a flower print dress and big picture hat plus spritzing herself in perfume habitually in the episode "The Time Bandit". She is so popular that her broadcast range goes as far as Thembria, where her transmission is banned by law but is heard, regardless of the penalty that comes with it. Baloo is the constant object of her desire as he owes her a grocery list of favors that in return she wants him to repay by going on a date with her, much to his reluctance and aversion to her blackmailing methods in doing so. She is possibly a pun on the World War II-era propagandist broadcaster Axis Sally during the war against the Allies by Nazi Germany with the same type of voice and patronizing tone in her broadcasts throughout war-torn Europe and on shortwave American radio. She also makes cameo appearances in the episodes "Louie's Last Stand" and "Time Waits for No Bear".
Ralph Throgmorton (voiced by Ken Sansom) is an immaculately dressed coypu with round glasses who works as a flight instructor for FLAP (the Federal Licensing Agency for Pilots) in Cape Suzette in the episode "On a Wing and a Bear". Uptight and humorless, he is known by the well-reputed and dreaded moniker "Love to Flunk 'Em". Throgmorton is extremely meticulous and does absolutely everything "alphabetically" (for example, he insists on having his car serviced by first having the Air in the tires checked, then the Brake fluid, then the Coolant, then the Dipstick, etc. in alphabetical order). This approach makes Baloo extremely nervous, which prevents him from renewing his flying license (he was also Baloo's driving instructor during his adolescence). In desperation, Baloo tries to find work in other fields, but somehow gets fired every time due to complaints by Throgmorton and even by his equally alphabetical granddaughter Kathy (voiced by Sherry Lynn) at a carnival ride. Baloo finally redeems himself in the instructor's eyes, and gets his license back when he rescues them both from a tight situation involving Don Karnage's air pirates, after discovering that they had been behind a series of oil raids that were causing an energy crisis on behalf of Shere Khan.
Airplane Jane (also known as Plane Jane) (voiced by Susan Silo), is a highly capable female hippopotamus pilot who learned to fly from Baloo (it reputedly took her a minute), and who shares almost the same mannerisms and behavior as her former mentor in the episode "Waiders of the Wost Tweasure". Plane Jane (as she is called by Baloo) was once a finishing school attendee with Princess Grace of Walla Walla Bing Bang, but "never finished". Despite her show-offish attitude (she never misses a chance to rub it to Baloo that she is the better pilot) and often sneaky, competitive nature, she also has a heart of gold underneath and would help out a friend in need.
Princess Grace (voiced by Victoria Carroll) is a white swan princess and first in line to the throne of the kingdom of Walla Walla Bing Bang in the episode "Waiders of the Wost Tweasure". However, her right to the throne is challenged by her supposed long-lost cousin Prince Rudolf, and in order to prove her right to rule she must obtain the long-lost Ruby Wings. After Baloo and Airplane Jane retrieve the wings and bring them to her, she is crowned queen. When said in a Walla Walla Bing Bang accent, her name is pronounced "Pwincess Gwace".
Prince Rudolf (voiced by Castellaneta) is a black swan who is supposedly second in line to the throne of the kingdom of Walla Walla Bing Bang and Princess Grace's long-lost cousin who is challenging the princess's right to the throne in the episode "Waiders of the Wost Tweasure". In reality, however, he is neither, since he is really a foreign imposter who wants to use the Ruby Wings to steal the throne and the kingdom. In the end, he is defeated by Baloo and Airplane Jane, who retrieve the wings and bring them to the princess in time for her to be crowned queen at the coronation. When said in a Walla Walla Bing Bang accent, his name is pronounced "Pwince Wudolf".
Captain William Stansbury (voiced by Peter Reneday) is a 19th-century lion sea captain who crashed his sailing ship a hundred years earlier onto what is now the island where Louie built his nightclub and whose ghost haunts when he is magically brought forth during a casual night of carousing in the episode "Her Chance to Dream". Frightened off the island and back to Cape Suzette, both Baloo and Louie tell an overtired Rebecca about the haunting, but she disbelieves them. Returning with trepidation and bringing Rebecca along, they find that the place is deserted until the captain's apparition appears before them in solid form (pretending to be a living person) and is highly enamoured by the businesswoman. With his handsome looks and gentlemanly manners, Rebecca becomes smitten with him, but in reality he is a snobbish, judgemental and bothersome poltergeist who prevents them from leaving the island. Seducing her under the moonlight with his charms during a walk on the island, the lonely ghost wants to take Rebecca away from the earthly world, an idea which she accepts in her tired state of mind. Baloo and Louie eventually discover that Stansbury is the ghost, so they try to capture him in a net but fail, and Stansbury then causes the wrecked ship to be restored and to bust out from under the nightclub as a flying ghost ship. While Baloo and Louie are forced to do chores by the captain's magical power, they find a book of spells in the ship that will get rid of Stansbury and return everything back to normal. They then begin to exorcise the ghost by reading a spell from the book, but Rebecca intervenes before they can finish. After the pilot gently convinces his tearful employer that this is neither a dream nor the life for her by reminding her of her daughter Molly who she left at home, Rebecca reluctantly finishes off the spell that sends the ghostly captain back into the spirit world. The captain promises to wait for her in the afterlife as the ghost ship flies up into the night sky. A painting of Stansbury that was shown earlier in the shipwreck under Louie's Place is now shown hanging prominently on a wall in Rebecca's apartment as she tells Molly about the captain.
Crazy Edie (voiced by Hayes) is a female wild-eyed and gravelly-voiced bird mechanic con-artist who sabotages airplanes in order to charge high prices to fix them, with the help of her four cute, furry gremlin-like creatures (voiced by Welker) who are forced against their will to assist her in the episode "The Sound and the Furry". She controls them with special collars fitted around their necks which cause them to destroy/disassemble machines (such as airplanes) when exposed to a certain sound frequency (such as that created by her tuning fork device, or when Wildcat banged a wrench against an engine). She is also accompanied by her pet alligator named Al. At one point, Edie temporarily loses the furry creatures, who are then found and befriended by Wildcat who mistakes and refers to them as lobsters. He later helps to free them and return them back to their home in the bayou after he and Baloo foil Edie's latest acts at a flying competition. Wildcat named the one with the red collar Sammy, the one with the green collar Frankie, the one with the pink collar Maxine, and the one with the blue collar Homer. Crazy Edie should not be confused with Baloo's old grade school classmate of the same name, who appears near the end of the episode "Sheepskin Deep". In the episode it's pronounced "E-dee"
Hans and Helga (voiced by Stan Jones and Joan Gerber respectively) are the homicidal servants of the von Bruinwald Castle in Bearvaria (read "Bavaria") who live to serve and kill the von Bruinwald family in order to gain the family's inheritance when Baloo becomes the latest Baron to hold the title in the episode "The Balooest of the Bluebloods". The badger butler Hans provides everything, including placing a shark into the pool and spooking Baloo with a family curse to make him paranoid, while the shrew housekeeper Helga dishes out poisonous meals to serve the pilot. They then go on a rampage to finish him and his houseguests off. They are finally stopped after Baloo fakes his own death with Rebecca's help, and informs the local authorities about the situation just as they and the von Bruinwald family lawyer Austin Featheridge arrive to tell him that they are foreclosing the castle and confiscating the fortune due to centuries of unpaid taxes.
Austin Featheridge (voiced by Gilbert) is the von Bruinwald family lawyer and financial representative who belongs to the law firm "Featheridge, Featheridge, and Nowinski". He is the one who first informs Baloo about his noble lineage, and he is also the one who later informs Baloo of the confiscation of his estate due to his family's unpaid taxes. He is an elderly white bird.
O'Roarke (voiced by Cummings) is an obnoxious, raspy-voiced bull who tricks Baloo and Wildcat into taking him to a mysterious land of dinosaurs that come alive with the aid of a magical waterfall, presumably to start a touring business in the episode "Paradise Lost". However, his real motives are considerably darker than what he leads the others to believe (he wants to start a hunting-guide business for big-game hunters who want to kill dinosaurs). In order to foil his plans, Wildcat shuts off the waterfall so as to hide the valley from the hunters, but due to the mechanic's good nature and feelings of wonder toward the prehistoric creatures, he secretly allows the waterfall to later reopen which allows the dinosaurs to live again in peace.
Nanuk (voiced by Cummings) is a large polar bear who lives in the Arctic in an igloo and speaks with an Inuit accent, and to whom Baloo delivers pizzas in the episode "Pizza Pie in the Sky". Nanuk is one of the customers of Baloo and Louie's "Pizza Pie in the Sky" pizza air delivery business, but the first delivery to him involves the wrong-sized pizza, prompting two more repeated deliveries to him, each of which also go awry.
Bob (voiced by Cummings) is the pelican fishmonger and owner of "Bob's Discount House of Fish" who reluctantly sells rancid anchovies to Baloo and Kit in the episode "Pizza Pie in the Sky".

References

External links
Characters © TaleSpin – Animation Source
Official TaleSpin characters – Animation Source
TaleSpin (TV Series 1990–1991) – Full Cast & Crew – IMDb
"TaleSpin" (1990) – Episodes cast – IMDb
TaleSpin – Voice Chasers
TaleSpin Cast – TV.com
Behind The Voice Actors – TaleSpin

 
Air pirates
Lists of characters in American television animation
Lists of fictional animals by work
TaleSpin